"Saved" is a gospel and R&B-flavored song written by Leiber and Stoller and first recorded by Rock and Roll Hall of Famer LaVern Baker in 1960. The tongue-in-cheek song is written from the perspective of someone who had lived a fast, loose life but is then "saved" and is now standing on a corner preaching to the passers-by.

On May 1, 1960, the recording reached No. 39 on the US Billboard charts.

Personnel
The musicians on the Baker recording include Gary Chester drums, Dick Vance and Taft Jordan trumpets, Rudy Powell alto sax, Al Sears tenor sax, Bert Keyes piano, Lilton Mitchell organ, Phil Spector guitar, Abie Baker bass, and Sticks Evans bass drum.  The arrangement was by Howard Biggs.

Cover versions
 Billy Fury & the Gamblers,   1965
 Judy Henske, 1966
 Joe Cocker, 1967
 The Chicago Loop, 1967
 Elvis Presley (as part of a medley with "Where Could I Go but to the Lord" and "Up Above My Head"), 1968
 Lulu, 1970
 The Band, 1973
 Brenda Lee, 1976
 Elkie Brooks,  1977
 Andrew Strong,  1992
 Smokey Joe's Cafe: The Songs of Leiber and Stoller, 1995, Grammy Award winner in 1996
 Shirley Johnson,   2002

References

1960 singles
Gospel songs
Elvis Presley songs
Songs written by Jerry Leiber and Mike Stoller
1960 songs